The city of Anderson, South Carolina,  began in 1826 with the formation of Anderson County. The amount of cotton being grown in the area allowed for the construction of mills and the town developed. Specific to the Anderson Historic District, much is residential and the homes show a number of different architectural styles, including Greek Revival, Romanesque Revival, Victorian, and Colonial Revival. Some modern buildings have been interspersed in the district, but much of the very accessible area is historically intact. The Anderson Historic District was listed in the National Register on December 13, 1971.

References

Historic districts on the National Register of Historic Places in South Carolina
Romanesque Revival architecture in South Carolina
Neoclassical architecture in South Carolina
Buildings and structures in Anderson County, South Carolina
National Register of Historic Places in Anderson County, South Carolina